Corredor Polonês (Portuguese for Polish Corridor) is the only studio album by Brazilian post-punk/experimental rock band Patife Band. It was released in 1987 via WEA, and reissued on CD in 2001.

The track "Poema em Linha Reta" is a poem written by Portuguese poet Fernando Pessoa under the pseudonym Álvaro de Campos set to music; both it and "Pregador Maldito" were re-recorded from the soundtrack of the 1986 film Cidade Oculta.

"Vida de Operário" is a cover of Brazilian punk band Excomungados; Pato Fu would more famously cover it as well, on their 1995 album Gol de Quem?

"Chapéu Vermelho" is a Portuguese-language adaptation/translation of the song "Li'l Red Riding Hood", written by Ronald Blackwell and originally performed by Sam the Sham and the Pharaohs. Hamilton Di Giorgio provided the translation into Portuguese.

Ratos de Porão covered both the tracks "Tô Tenso" and "Corredor Polonês", while Cássia Eller covered "Teu Bem".

Track listing

Personnel
 Paulo Barnabé – vocals
 André Fonseca – guitars
 Cidão Trindade – drums
 Sidney Giovenazzi – bass
 Paulo Mello – piano
 Pena Schmidt – production, mastering
 Liminha – art direction

References

External links
 Corredor Polonês at Discogs

1987 debut albums
Patife Band albums
Portuguese-language albums